Mammoth Creek is a creek in Iron and Garfield counties in southern Utah, United States, that flows for over  through mountains and forests from Mammoth Summit (near Brian Head, Utah), through the Mammoth Valley, to its confluence with the Sevier River (near Hatch). The creek contains wild brown trout and hatchery rainbow trout.

See also

 List of rivers of Utah

References

External links

 Upper Sevier Watershed Project

Dixie National Forest
Rivers of Utah
Rivers of Iron County, Utah
Rivers of Garfield County, Utah